On the Prowl may refer to:
On the Prowl (album), an album by Japanese band Loudness
On the Prowl (EP), an EP by Australian band Operator Please
On the Prowl (film series), a series of pornographic films starring Jamie Gillis
"On the Prowl" (song), a 1976 song by Australian band Ol' 55
 On the Prowl, a 2023 album by Steel Panther